Torbjørn Vereide (born 19 February 1989) is a Norwegian politician.

He was elected representative to the Storting from the constituency of Sogn og Fjordane for the period 2021–2025, for the Labour Party. He was deputy representative to the Storting 2017–2021.

References

1989 births
Living people
Labour Party (Norway) politicians
Sogn og Fjordane politicians
Members of the Storting
21st-century Norwegian politicians